The ninth government of Israel was formed by David Ben-Gurion on 17 December 1959 following the November 1959 elections. Ben-Gurion largely kept the same coalition partners as during the previous government (i.e. Mapai, the National Religious Party, Mapam, Ahdut HaAvoda, the Progressive Party and Agriculture and Development), and added the new Israeli Arab parties Progress and Development and Cooperation and Brotherhood.

The government collapsed when Ben-Gurion resigned on 31 January 1961, over a motion of no-confidence brought by Herut and the General Zionists following the publication of the findings of the Committee of Seven concerning the Lavon Affair. At the end of February Ben-Gurion informed President Yitzhak Ben-Zvi that he could not form a new government, and new elections were called after the Knesset was dissolved in March.

Cabinet members

1 Died in office.

References

External links
Fourth Knesset: Government 9 Knesset website

 09
1959 establishments in Israel
1961 disestablishments in Israel
Cabinets established in 1959
Cabinets disestablished in 1961
1959 in Israeli politics
1960 in Israeli politics
1961 in Israeli politics
 09
 09